Santa María de Sando is a municipality located in the province of Salamanca, Castile and León, Spain. As of 2016, the municipality has a population of 119 inhabitants. Its postal code is 37468.

References

Municipalities in the Province of Salamanca